Kathleen Anne Edwards is a former Canadian politician. She served as MLA for the Kootenay riding in the Legislative Assembly of British Columbia from 1986 to 1996, as a member of the British Columbia New Democratic Party. Edwards served as British Columbia's first female Minister for Energy Mines and Petroleum Resources in the government of Michael Harcourt (1991–1995).
Anne Edwards is also the author of Seeking Balance: Conversations with BC Women in Politics (Caitlin Press Inc, 2008).

References

1935 births
Living people
British Columbia New Democratic Party MLAs
Women government ministers of Canada
Members of the Executive Council of British Columbia
People from Tisdale, Saskatchewan
Women MLAs in British Columbia
20th-century Canadian politicians
20th-century Canadian women politicians